"Under the Moon of Love" is a song written by Tommy Boyce and Curtis Lee, and first recorded in 1961 by Curtis Lee.   Produced by Phil Spector,  Lee's recording was released on Dunes Records #45-2008, with the "B" side "Beverly Jean". It peaked on the Billboard Hot 100 at No. 46 on November 27, 1961.

Showaddywaddy version
In 1976 the song was revived by rock and roll revival act Showaddywaddy  and became a major hit in the UK.  The Mike Hurst-produced version went on to spend three weeks at the top of the UK Singles Chart in December that year, and has since sold over a million copies in the UK.

Chart performance
Curtis Lee

Showaddywaddy

Other version
In 1975, Mud covered the song for their album Use Your Imagination which reached No. 33 in the UK Albums Chart. It was also the B-side of their 1976 single, "Beating Around The Bush", which failed to chart.

References

Song recordings produced by Phil Spector
1961 singles
1976 singles
American songs
British songs
European Hot 100 Singles number-one singles
UK Singles Chart number-one singles
1961 songs
Song recordings produced by Mike Hurst (producer)
Songs written by Tommy Boyce
Songs written by Curtis Lee
Warner Records singles
Bell Records singles
Showaddywaddy songs